Martin Ingram (born 1965 in Banff) is a Scottish radio presenter, currently working for Original 106 (Aberdeen) presenting an afternoon show. Ingram did work for Northsound Radio. He first worked on Northsound 1 then later on switched over to Northsound 2.

Ingram is a prolific collector of Barbie dolls and owns several pre production 1950's dolls, valued at several thousand pounds each.

See also
Original 106 (Aberdeen)

References

1965 births
Living people
Scottish radio presenters